The districts of the Trust Territory of the Pacific Islands were the primary subdivisions of the Trust Territory of the Pacific Islands.

History

In 1962 there existed six districts with the following population:
 Chuuk District - 22564
 Mariana Islands District - 9586
 Marshall Islands District - 15710
 Palau District - 9965
 Pohnpei District - 17224
 Yap District - 5931

"In a 1975 plebiscite the Northern Marianas group voted to become a commonwealth of the United States and, from 1976, was administered separately from the rest of the territory. The remaining island groups were reorganized again into six districts...", the Kosrae District was created out of the Pohnpei District, keeping six districts.

References